Dhaunkal (Urdu, Punjabi ), is a town and Union Council in Wazirabad Tehsil, Gujranwala District, Punjab, Pakistan. It is located on the Lahore-Islamabad Highway, 28 kilometres from the district capital Gujranwala and about 15 kilometres from Gujrat. Dhaunkal is one of the biggest and oldest towns in Wazirabad Tehsil.  The population of Dhaunkal is 25000, of which 10000 registered to vote. Due to access to transportation, it is possible to get to Dhaunkal from all over Pakistan in 24 hours because NHA provides full access.

Clans 
There are several main clans - Kalair, Jawanda,Jalib, Naqvi,Cheema, Warraich, Rehmani ,Sandhu, Rajpoot and Sheikh, which own almost 3600 acres and 10 marlas of land. Rice and wheat cultivation and the raising of cattle - water buffaloes and cows - are the primary agricultural activities. Dhaunkal's principal natural resources are arable land and water. About 75% of Dhaunkal's total land area is under cultivation, and it is serviced by a large irrigation system made up of canals.

Religion

Dhaunkal is famous as Sakhi Sarwar di Nagri (a town of Sakhi Sarwar). 95% of its population are Muslims, and Christians make up the remaining 5%. They Have their own church & have complete freedom of their rights. Sikhs and Hindus are migrated and disappeared due to partition and communal riots before August 15, 1947.

Sufi Saints in Dhaunkal 
 Chilla Gaah of Sakhi Sarwar Sayyed Ahmed Sultan, Lakkh Data Deewan Lala Wali Sarkar
 The shrine of Syed Shah Sawwar is located near the Chilla Gaah of Sakhi Sarwar.
 Pir Syed Sardar Shah Badshah is a Majzoob Sufi saint whose shrine is also in Dhaunkal.

Landmarks
 Judicial Complex Wazirabad
 Wazirabad Cardiology Hospital
 Many CNG stations and petrol pumps
 Rural Health Centre
 Union Council Offices
 Water Supply Office
 Pakistan Post Office
 Pakistan Railway Station
 Superior group of colleges Wazirabad campus
 2 Banks with ATM
 Govt boys high school 
 Govt girls high school 
 4 Govt primary schools 
 Private schools
 Cricket and Football grounds
 Dhaunkal railway station

Villages of Dhaunkal Union Council 
 Jandiala Dhabwala
 Dadwali
 Chak Baig
 Siranwali
 Borre Wali
 Nawan Pind
 Kot Hussain
 Kot Fazal Ahmed

Climate
The climate of Dhaunkal changes quite drastically through the year. The summer periods last from June through September when the temperature reaches 36-42 degrees Celsius. The coldest months are usually November to February. The temperature can drop to seven degrees Celsius. The highest precipitation months are usually July and August when the monsoon season hits Punjab Province. During the other months the average rainfall is roughly 25 mm. The driest months are usually November through April, when little rainfall is seen.

Sports
 Dhaunkal Stars Cricket Club was established in 2001. Ahmad Mujtaba and Imran Aslam were founder DSCC is affiliated with the Pakistan Cricket Board and District Cricket Association of Gujranwala.
 Sakhi Sarwar Cricket Club Dhaunkal. Sakhi Sarwar cricket club is the first cricket club of Dhaunkal which affiliated with the Pakistan cricket board.Zubair Ahmed klaire, Asjad Iqbal and Sajid Sikandar and other teammates had registered the club with the Pakistan Cricket Board in 1999. Asmat Ali Tashi and many other local cricket stars are the founder of the Sakhi Sarwar cricket club in 1986.
 Sakhi Sarwar Football Club Dhaunkal
 Dhaunkal star junior football club Dhaunkal
 Badminton teams

References

Cities and towns in Gujranwala District
Populated places in Wazirabad Tehsil